Elsa Tenorio (born 18 May 1963) is a Mexican diver. She competed at the 1980 Summer Olympics and the 1984 Summer Olympics.

References

1963 births
Living people
Mexican female divers
Olympic divers of Mexico
Divers at the 1980 Summer Olympics
Divers at the 1984 Summer Olympics
Place of birth missing (living people)